Tomáš Šmíd was the defending champion, but lost in the first round this year.

Libor Pimek won the title, defeating Gene Mayer 6–4, 4–6, 7–6, 6–4 in the final.

Seeds

  Tomáš Šmíd (first round)
  Gene Mayer (final)
  Brian Teacher (first round)
  Wojtek Fibak (second round)
  Mike Bauer (first round)
  Wally Masur (first round)
  Balázs Taróczy (first round)
  John Lloyd (first round)

Draw

Final

Section 1

Section 2

External links
 1984 BMW Open draw

Singles